The Archive of Public Protests (A-P-P or APP) is a collective of photographers and writers and their work documenting post-2015 protests in Poland, established in 2019. A website and an Instagram account host its images and it also publishes Strike Newspaper. Members of the collective include co-founder Rafał Milach as well as Adam Lach and Chris Niedenthal. The collective has been nominated for the Spojrzenia award as well as the Paszport Polityki, and has had an exhibition of its work at Labyrinth Gallery in Lublin.

Details
The Archive of Public Protests was established in 2019 by Rafał Milach and five other photographers, in response to Law and Justice taking power and making drastic changes to policy and legislation, resulting in many protests and protest movements.

A website and an Instagram account host the images, which include photographs of the protests against Polish judiciary reforms, the August 2020 LGBT protests in Poland, the 2020–2021 women's strike protests in Poland, and the 2020–2021 Belarusian protests.

The archive is intended "to serve as a resource, as evidence of the protests", given "Polish mainstream media, which is now almost entirely controlled by the state, has given little airtime to the ongoing action." "There is no editorial goal. Instead, the APP is a depository of information for academics, historians and journalists to utilise."

The collective also publishes Gazeta Strajkowa / Strike Newspaper, which launched in 2020. It includes photography, writing, bold typography and coded symbolism. The printed paper is handed out for free, or available to download. Its design is such that people can "hold up the pages as flags, paste them on walls as posters, and display them in windows."

Members

Michał Adamski
Marta Bogdańska
Karolina Gembara
Łukasz Głowala
Agata Kubis
Michalina Kuczyńska
Marcin Kruk
Adam Lach
Alicja Lesiak
Rafał Milach
Joanna Musiał
Chris Niedenthal
Wojtek Radwański
Bartek Sadowski
Paweł Starzec
Karolina Sobel
Grzegorz Wełnicki
Dawid Zieliński

Publications
Gazeta Strajkowa / Strike Newspaper n. 1. Self-published, 2020. .
Gazeta Strajkowa / Strike Newspaper n. 2. Self-published, 2020. .
Gazeta Strajkowa / Strike Newspaper n. 3. Self-published, 2021. .
Gazeta Strajkowa / Strike Newspaper n. 4. Self-published, 2021. .
Gazeta Strajkowa / Strike Newspaper n. 5. Self-published, 2021. .
Gazeta Strajkowa / Strike Newspaper n. 6. Self-published, 2021. .

Awards
2021: Nominated, Spojrzenia, Zachęta
2021: Nominated, Paszport Polityki, Polityka

Exhibitions

Solo exhibitions by APP
It's Going to Be Fine, We Just Need to Change Everything: The Archive of Public Protests, Chris Niedenthal, Labyrinth Gallery, Lublin, Poland, 2021/22

Group exhibitions
Who Will Write the History of Tears: Artists on Women's Rights, Museum of Modern Art, Warsaw, 2021/22

See also
2015 Polish presidential election
2020 Polish presidential election

Notes

References

External links

Polish news websites
Photography websites
Photo archives in Poland
2019 establishments in Poland
Strike paper